Bornetella sphaerica, commonly known as the spherical turtle shell, is a species of marine alga in the Dasycladaceae family. It is found in the tropical Indo-Pacific region, the type-location being Sorong, Irian Jaya, Indonesia.

Description
The thallus of Bornetella sphaerica is attached to the substrate by a disc-shaped holdfast. The slender cylindrical stipe is continuous with the central vein that extends halfway along the thallus. The vein bears whorls of fine lateral filaments and terminates in a whorl of threadlike branches with neatly-arranged inflated hexagonal ends.

Distribution and habitat
Bornetella sphaerica is found in the Indo-Pacific region, its range extending from East Africa and Madagascar to Japan, the Philippines, Hawaii and northern Australia.

References

Dasycladaceae
Algae of Australia
Algae of Hawaii
Species described in 1892